The Morocco Tennis Tour – Mohammedia is a professional tennis tournament played on outdoor red clay courts. It is currently part of the Association of Tennis Professionals (ATP) Challenger Tour. It is held annually at the Royal Tennis Club à Mohammedia in Mohammedia, Morocco.

Past finals

Singles

Doubles

References

External links

 
ATP Challenger Tour
Clay court tennis tournaments
 
Tennis tournaments in Morocco